Raphidonema is the scientific name of two genera and may refer to:

Raphidomena (alga), a genus of algae in the family Koliellaceae
Raphidomena (sponge), a genus of sponges